The Czech Bishops' Conference is the standing conference of the Catholic bishops of the Czech Republic. Based in Prague, the CBC represents the Catholic Church in the Czech Republic, both in Bohemian and Moravian provinces of the Roman Catholic Church since 1996, Greek Catholic and Apostolic Exarchate. It was founded in early 1993, the date of independence for the Czech Republic, as the successor to the Czechoslovak Bishops' Conference. Members of the Bishops' Conference according to canon 447 CIC: in conjunction perform pastoral duties in favor of the Christians in their territory, to achieve the greater good which the Church gives to people according to law, especially apostolic actions suitably adapted to the time and place. The Episcopal Church of the conference is a legal entity run by the Apostolic See, its character and activities are governed by the 1983 Code of Canon Law, specifically canons 447-459.

Episcopal conferences in various European countries constitute the Council of European Bishops' Conferences.
Members of the Czech Bishops' Conference are diocesan bishops of Latin Rite and Byzantine Rite, and position them on an equal footing auxiliary bishops and other titular Bishops who throughout the territory or outside for the whole nation to perform specific tasks under a mandate from the Holy See or the Czech Bishops' Conference. The members of the Episcopal Conference of Bishops are not those of the former hidden church environment who did not accept the official Church Episcopal condition for public exposure or not it actually officially commissioned (see hidden Bishops of the Church) - the most famous of the still .

Presidents
 Miloslav Vlk, Cardinal Archbishop of Prague (1993–2000) 
 Jan Graubner, Archbishop of Olomouc (2000–2010 and again since 2020)
 Dominik Duka, Cardinal Archbishop of Prague (2010–2020)
The current vice-president is Bishop Jan Vokál of Hradec Králové and the General Secretary is Monsignor Stanislav Přibyl.

Speaker
The CBC speaker function is traditionally filled by a person who is not a member. In this capacity, he succeeded Daniel Herman, Martin Horalek, Miloslav Fiala, Irene Sargánková. Sometimes mentioned as a spokesman for the employee of the press center CBK Gračko George, in whose purview the website management, translation and editing of foreign news.

Collective bodies
Czech Bishops' Conference has the following authorities:
 Permanent Council: five-member executive body; in 2022 it was composed of
 Chairman Jan Graubner
 Vice Chairman Jan Vokál
 General Secretary of the ČBK Stanislav Přibyl
 bishop Jan Baxant of Litoměřice
 bishop Martin David
 General Secretariat
 Economic Council
 Commission established to the specific objectives: their mission is a mandate to prepare material for plenum CBC, Delegates-bishops, bishops authority to specific tasks, which can compile each delegate expert advice.

The February 2010 CBK had seven expert committees:
 For the Doctrine of the Faith (4 members, Chairman Zdeněk Wasserbauer)
 For the liturgy (4 members, Chairman Martin David)
 For the priesthood (4 members, Chairman Pavel Konzbul)
 For Catholic Education (3 members, Chairman Tomáš Holub, each member is the chairman of one section)
 Economics and law (4 members, Chairman Tomáš Holub)
 Joint committee of ČBK and KVŘP (3 members, including bishop Martin David)
The July 2022 provisions were bishops, delegates and experts advising for the following areas:
 Media (Bishop-delegate Jan Baxant)
 Laymen a movements (Vlastimil Kročil)
 Family (Josef Nuzík)
 Youth (Pavel Posád)
 Healthcare (Josef Nuzík)
 Spiritual service in the army, prisons, police and firefighters (Zdeněk Wasserbauer)
 Expatriates (Václav Malý)
 Ecumenism (Tomáš Holub)
 Iustitia et Pax (Justice and Peace), minorities and migrants (Václav Malý)
 Mission and new evangelization (Jan Graubner)
 Culture and heritage (Antonín Basler)
 Information technology (Vlastimil Kročil)
 Cooperation with the Commission of the Bishops Conference of the EU (Jan Vokál)
 Nepomucenum (Czech seminary in Rome) (Jan Vokál)
 Eucharistic congresses (Jan Vokál)
 Care of creation (Antonín Basler)
 Czech Catholic Biblical Work (Zdeněk Wasserbauer)
 Charity and social services (Jan Graubner)
The head of the Bishops' Conference Secretariat Secretary General, member of the CBC. He shall be responsible to the Secretary, Executive Secretary, press center and professional sections. In February 2010, the Secretariat had specialized sections: Translation, economic, legal, religious education, catechesis, youth and pastoral-evangelistic.

Established legal entity
CBC is the administrator of other legal entities:
 National Center for Family
 St. Egidio Community
 Work of Mary (Focolare Movement) - male part
 Work of Mary (Focolare Movement) - female part
 The St. Vincent de Paul in the Czech Republic
 Mothers Prayers - a movement of Christian Mothers
 Caritas Czech Republic
 Czech Catholic Biblical Work
 Beatitudes community in the Czech Republic
 Fatima apostolate in the Czech Republic

Members

Former members
 Antonín Liška (from inception to the year 2003)
 Jaroslav Škarvada (from inception to the year 2010)
 Josef Koukl (from inception to the year 2010)
 Karel Otčenášek (from inception to the year 2011)
 Jiří Paďour, OFM Cap (from 1996 to the year 2015)
 Cardinal Miloslav Vlk (member since inception, in 1993-2000 chairman, deceased)
 František Lobkowicz (from creation, deceased)

Current members

Roman Catholic bishops
 Jan Graubner (member since inception, in the years 2000-2010 chairman)
 Cardinal Dominik Duka (member since 1998, chairman since 2010)
 František Radkovský (since inception)
 Vojtěch Cikrle (since inception)
 Josef Hrdlička (since inception)
 Josef Kajnek (since inception)
 Václav Malý (since 1997)
 Petr Esterka (since 1999)
 Karel Herbst (2002)
 Pavel Posád (since 2004)
 Jan Baxant (since 2008)
 Jan Vokál (since 2011)
 Vlastimil Kročil (since 2015)
 Tomáš Holub (since 2016)
 Pavel Konzbul (since 2016)

Greek-Catholic bishops
 Ladislav Hučko (since 2003)
 Ján Eugen Kočiš (2004-2019)

See also
 Catholic Church in the Czech Republic

References

External links
 http://www.cirkev.cz/cirkev-v-cr/ceska-biskupska-konference/

Czech Republic
Catholic Church in the Czech Republic